Bębnikąt  is a settlement in the administrative district of Gmina Stargard, within Stargard County, West Pomeranian Voivodeship, in north-western Poland.

See also
History of Pomerania

References

Villages in Stargard County